Events from the 1420s in England.

Incumbents
Monarch – Henry V (to 31 August 1422), then Henry VI

Events
 1420
 21 May – Henry V of England and Charles VI of France sign the Treaty of Troyes, making Henry heir to the French throne.
 2 June – Henry marries Catherine of Valois, Charles's daughter.
 17 November – Hundred Years' War: Melun surrenders to the English.
 Henry's flagship, the Grace Dieu, makes her only known service voyage, across the Solent.
 1421
 23 February – coronation of Catherine of Valois as Queen Consort.
 21 March: Hundred Years' War: English defeated by the French and Scottish at the Battle of Baugé.
 Collegiate church licensed in Manchester, the origin of Manchester Cathedral.
 1422
 10 May – Hundred Years' War: Siege of Meaux – Meaux surrenders to the English.
 31 August – Henry VI becomes King of England aged nine months, following the death of his father Henry V. His uncle Humphrey, Duke of Gloucester, acts as his regent in England.
 21 October – Henry VI is proclaimed King of France in Paris following the death of Charles VI under the terms of the Treaty of Troyes. His uncle John of Lancaster, 1st Duke of Bedford, acts as his regent in France.
 30 October – Charles the dauphin defies the Treaty of Troyes to be declared Charles VII of France in Bourges.
 1423
 April – Hundred Years' War: England allies with Burgundy and Brittany against France.
 31 July – Hundred Years' War: the English defeat the French and Scottish at the Battle of Cravant.
 1424
 5 April – James I of Scotland, having been detained at the English court since 1406, is ransomed and returns to take up his throne.
 17 August – Hundred Years' War: the English led by the Duke of Bedford defeat the French and Scottish at the Battle of Verneuil.
 16 October – Duke of Gloucester invades Hainault; Bishop Henry Beaufort takes control of government in England.
 1425
 April – Duke of Gloucester abandons his failed invasion of Hainault.
 10 August – Hundred Years' War: Le Mans surrenders to the English.
 30 October – Henry Beaufort tries to occupy London.
 1426
 6 March – Hundred Years' War: the English defeat the French at the Battle of St. James at Avranches.
 12 March – following the "Parliament of Bats" at Leicester Castle, Henry Beaufort resigns as Lord Chancellor and leaves the country, being replaced by John Kemp.
 1427
 13 October – Lincoln College, Oxford, founded by Richard Fleming, Bishop of Lincoln.
 1428
 12 October – Hundred Years' War: English commence the Siege of Orléans.
 Henry Beaufort, now a Cardinal, returns to England and preaches a crusade against the Hussites.
 1429
 12 February – Hundred Years' War: at the Battle of the Herrings, English forces under Sir John Fastolf defend a supply convoy carrying rations to the army of William de la Pole, 4th Earl of Suffolk at Orléans from attack by the Comte de Clermont and John Stuart.
 8 May – Hundred Years' War: the French under Joan of Arc lift the Siege of Orléans.
 11–12 June – Hundred Years' War: the French defeat the English at the Battle of Jargeau.
 15 June – Hundred Years' War: the French defeat the English at the Battle of Meung-sur-Loire.
 16–17 June – Hundred Years' War: the French defeat the English at the Battle of Beaugency.
 18 June – Hundred Years' War: the French defeat the English at the Battle of Patay.
 6 November – coronation of King Henry VI.

Births
 1420
 24 November – John Stafford, 1st Earl of Wiltshire, politician (died 1473)
 1421
 25 July – Henry Percy, 3rd Earl of Northumberland, politician (died 1461)
 6 December – King Henry VI of England (died 1471)
 1422
probable – William Caxton, printer (died c. 1491)
 1423
 24 August – Thomas Rotherham, cleric (died 1500)
 1425
date unknown – Edmund Sutton, nobleman (died 1483)
 1426
date unknown
William Brandon, nobleman (died 1485)
Anne Neville, Countess of Warwick (died 1492)
 1427
 9 September – Thomas de Ros, 10th Baron de Ros, politician (died 1464)
 1428
 22 November – Richard Neville, 16th Earl of Warwick, kingmaker (died 1471)
 1429
 30 January – Humphrey FitzAlan, 15th Earl of Arundel (died 1438)
 23 March – Margaret of Anjou, queen of Henry VI of England (died 1482)

Deaths
 1421
 22 March – Thomas of Lancaster, 1st Duke of Clarence, second son of Henry IV of England (killed in battle) (born 1388)
 date unknown – John FitzAlan, 13th Earl of Arundel (born 1385)
 1422
 31 August – King Henry V of England (born 1387)
 probable – Thomas Walsingham, chronicler (year of birth unknown)
 1423
 20 October – Henry Bowet, Archbishop of York (year of birth unknown)
 date unknown – Richard Whittington, Lord Mayor of London (born 1358)
 1424
 17 May – Bertram Fitzalan, Carmelite theologian
 John Clopton, Member of Parliament for Gloucester
 William Ickham, Member of Parliament for Canterbury
 John Persons, Member of Parliament for Wiltshire
 1425
 18 January – Edmund Mortimer, 5th Earl of March, politician (born 1391)
 8 July – Lady Elizabeth FitzAlan (born 1366)
 1426
 March/May – Thomas Hoccleve, English poet (born c. 1368)
 24 November – Elizabeth of Lancaster, Duchess of Exeter, Plantagenet noblewoman, daughter of John of Gaunt (born c. 1363)
 31 December – Thomas Beaufort, 1st Duke of Exeter, military leader (born c. 1377)
 1427
 7 May – Thomas la Warr, 5th Baron De La Warr, churchman (born c. 1352)
 27 August – Reginald West, 6th Baron De La Warr (born 1395)
 1428
 3 November – Thomas Montacute, 4th Earl of Salisbury, military leader (mortally wounded at the Siege of Orleans, the first prominent English victim of ordnance) (born 1388)
 probable – John Purvey, theologian (born 1353)
 1429
 30 December – Margaret Holland, noblewoman (born 1385)

References